The Pageant of Labour was a large-scale musical and dramatic show held at The Crystal Palace, London, England, on 15–20 October 1934. With words by Matthew Anderson and music by Alan Bush, it celebrated the history of the British labour movement, and like most pageants of the era was a mixture of instrumental and choral music, drama and dance. It was organised by the Central Women's Organisation Committee of the London Trades Council and directed by Edward Genn. Bush and Michael Tippett conducted the choir and orchestra. Among the cast was the 15-year-old Nigel Stock.

References

Official Book and Programme of the Pageant of Labour, 1934

External links
 

Festivals in London
British trade unions history
1934 in England